Marsha Petrie Sue (born 1946) is an author, public speaker, and motivational coach from Scottsdale, Arizona, United States. She has produced over 27 titles of CDs, DVDs, and books including Toxic People: Decontaminate Difficult People at Work Without Using Weapons or Work and The Reactor Factor: How to Deal With Difficult Situations at Work Without Going Nuclear. Her best selling books have been translated into Russian, Romanian, Czech, French and Portuguese. Her work has been featured in The New York Times, Wall Street Journal, USA Today, Newsweek On-Line, Business Journal, The Boston Globe, Women's Media, AllBusiness.com, Cosmopolitan, and more. One of her first books, The CEO of YOU: Leading Yourself to Success was named the Arizona Book Publishers Association Non-Fiction Best Book of the Year.

Biography 
Sue was born in 1946 in Long Beach, California, near her parents' home in Palos Verdes. Her father, Marshall, was an accountant in San Pedro, and her mother, Dorothy, was a real estate broker. She was active in theater in high school and graduated from California State University at Long Beach in 1968 with a Home Economics Bachelor of Arts degree.

Career 
After realizing being a schoolteacher was not the career of her dreams, she was hired into gourmet food and candy sales as the first woman salesperson for a Los Angeles company. She was then hired away by GTE Directories and sold the Yellow Pages. She was one of the first women to serve on the board of the National Yellow Pages Service Association. In 1986 she was hired away by another Yellow Pages company. She retired from the industry in 1992.

In 1985 she received her Masters of Business Administration from the University of Phoenix.

In 1992 she started her own company, Communicating Results, Inc. as a professional speaker and author.

In 2022 Sue was appointed to the Arizona Game and Fish Commission.

She is the Chair of the Women's Outdoor Media Association, Executive Committee of the Women's Leadership Forum and a member of the Outdoor Writers Association. Along with Ruth Covey, Sue founded Women's Safety & Leadership Training.

Sue has been a visiting professor at Arizona State University and has served as executive vice president at Westinghouse Financial Services, director of national accounts at USWest/Qwest, and as regional markets manager at GTE Directory Company. She serves on the NRA Women’s Leadership Forum Executive Committee and has opposed gun control.

Personal life 
In 1992 she met and married Al Sue.

Sue enjoys fishing and sporting clays. Sue and her husband are involved in many conservation projects in Arizona, including Arizona Antelope Foundation and the Arizona Elk Foundation.

Authored works 
Sue has written over 27 books, including: 
 The Reactor Factor
 Toxic People
 The CEO of You
 The Accountability Master
 Presentation Success Secrets
 Are You Listening?
 It's About Time!
 Customer Service
 Winning Together
 Is Your Life Working?
 Team Building the Easy Way
 Communicating with Empathy

Sue's books have been featured in the Wall Street Journal, USA Today, Newsweek On-Line, Phoenix Business Journal, Boston Globe, Women's Media Center, AllBusiness.com, Cosmopolitan, The Detroit News, and more.

Copyright Infringement
In 2010, communication expert Lillian Glass won a jury verdict for copyright infringement against Marsha Petrie Sue for having published in 2007 a book entitled Toxic People.  Glass had written a book by that same title in 1995, and the 2007 book contained word-for-word copying of Glass's work. The incident has generated controversy around Sue's membership in the National Speakers Association.

Professional memberships and recognition 
 Board Member - Reliance Bank of Arizona
 Women of Spirit Award - American Red Cross
 Spokesperson - Arizona Magic of Music and Dance for Special Needs Children
 Former Executive Director - Women of Scottsdale
 President and Member of the Year - National Speakers Association Arizona
 Delta Delta Delta - District President

References

Sue, Marsha Petrie. "Meet Marsha", Retrieved on November 20, 2011.
Sue, Marsha Petrie (2007). 'Toxic people: decontaminate difficult people at work without using weapons or duct tape', John Wiley & Sons, Hoboken,  NJ.
Sue, Marsha Petrie (2009). 'The reactor factor: how to respond positively to negative situations at work', John Wiley & Sons, Hoboken,  NJ.

American motivational speakers
Women motivational speakers
Writers from Scottsdale, Arizona
1946 births
Living people
People from Palos Verdes, California
California State University, Long Beach alumni
University of Phoenix alumni